The Southfield Furnace Ruin in Southfields, New York, was a longtime smelting site for iron ore mined from nearby veins in what is now Sterling Forest State Park. It is located on the north side of Orange County Route 19, 0.7 miles northwest of the junction with New York State Route 17.

It was added to the National Register of Historic Places on November 2, 1973 for its significance in industry.

History
It was built by Peter Townsend II, who also owned the mines. The Southfield Ironworks in addition to the furnace included a stamping mill, grist mill, saw mill, smith shop, wheel wright shop, coal shed, store, and stables.

The furnace was shut down in September 1887.

Gallery

See also
 National Register of Historic Places in Orange County, New York
 Clove Furnace Ruin

References

External links 
  Hike passes by ruin

National Register of Historic Places in Orange County, New York
Industrial buildings completed in 1804
Buildings and structures in Orange County, New York
Industrial furnaces